Menschenliebe is an independent German feature film directed by Alexander Tuschinski. It had its premiere in Stuttgart, Germany in December  2010. It was screened and received numerous awards at international film-festivals, was additionally shown in various cinemas and screening events in Germany, and was officially released online in June 2013. It is the first instalment of Tuschinski's informal Trilogy of Rebellion - three very different feature films connected by the same thoughts, ideas and main characters, although each tells an independent story: Menschenliebe, Timeless and an upcoming project called Revolution!. Additionally, the film Break-Up refers to some events of Menschenliebe.

Plot 
The film is about a young physics-student, Arnold Richter, who loves classical music - especially Mozart's opera Don Giovanni. Being a shy introvert, he has no luck finding a girlfriend. One day, he meets a man reminiscent of Don Giovanni. His new mentor teaches him how to seduce any woman in two minutes - but the more Arnold follows his advice, the more surreal his world becomes.

Themes

Classical Music 
The protagonist of Menschenliebe, Arnold, is fond of classical music and mentions that Don Giovanni is his favorite opera and that he attended a performance the day before the film's story starts. Therefore, in Menschenliebe there are numerous references to classical music, and its score consists mostly of classical pieces. In the film's beginning, they are often orchestra-recordings, while towards the end they are often recorded on synthesizer as Arnold's world becomes more and more surrealistic.

Opera Music 
Menschenliebe'''s soundtrack includes many pieces from operas by Mozart. The film opens with the overture to Nozze di Figaro. Tuschinski was inspired by Jean-Pierre Ponnelle's film of that opera for his opening montage, and had planned to open a film that way since his early youth. The film's opening, set to the music, is also an "overture" as it already features many elements that appear later in the film: Arnold's writing, rejection-letters from girls, Konstantin kissing a woman, among other elements.

Further into the film, when Arnold first encounters Konstantin, the opening of the aria voi che sapete from Nozze di Figaro is played. The aria deals with a young man's longing for women, which is thematically related to Arnold's and Konstantin's dialogue. While Konstantin seduces a woman in the bar to demonstrate Arnold his techniques, we hear an instrumental version of Das Klinget so Herrlich from The Magic Flute - an aria in which the opera's protagonists sing about the wonderful sound of a glockenspiel. The scene in the film is an ironic reference to the aria, as the girl in the bar is enchanted by Konstantin's words like the opera's protagonists by the glockenspiel.

Towards the film's ending, its score incorporates more and more pieces from Don Giovanni, suggesting that Konstantin is Don Giovanni: When Konstantin demonstrates Arnold how to flirt successfully, the aria Deh Vieni Alla Finestra is played in an instrumental version. In the opera, Don Giovanni attempts to seduce a woman with that aria. In the film, Arnold seduces a girl with words that Konstantin tells him to use. As Konstantin later sits in the cafeteria playing the piano, he plays a menuet from Don Giovanni. He later starts singing a song set to the music of the aria Fin Ch'Han Dal Vino to invite bystanders to his party. In the opera the song is dealing with preparing Don Giovanni's big celebration. Before the party, Arnold and Konstantin joke around in Arnold's apartment and sing to the music of Gia La Mensa e Preparata, the beginning of the finale of Don Giovanni. Like Don Giovanni in the opera, Konstantin sits at a table and jokes around while eating and drinking. During the opening of Arnold's great party, an instrumental version of the aria Riposate, vezzose ragazze is played, which in the opera is also set during a big celebration.

 Instrumental Music 
As with Mozart's opera music, classical instrumental music - often by Beethoven - is used in the film's soundtrack, many times thematically linked to the scenes its played in:

During Arnold's frustrating day in the idyllic park near a lake, the second movement of Beethoven's sixth symphony is played. That movement was labeled by Beethoven as an idyllic "scene by a stream". During Arnold's frustrating experience in the student's association, an electronic version of the Grand Fugue is played to show his emotional distress. Following the scene, as he walks through the park alone and takes brief rests, the second movement of Schubert's ninth symphony is played. The moments Arnold rests are always at the moments when the second theme of the movement plays.

Right before and while Konstantin seduces the 18-year-old pupil, we hear the opening minutes of the finale of Niccolò Paganini's first violin concerto. This could be seen as an ironic reference to rumors about Paganini being a womanizer.Beethoven's ninth symphony is used multiple times: As Konstantin shows Arnold how not to care about other people (by insulting and beating them), the happy march from the symphony's finale and the following chorus-section are played in an ironic way. At the end, when Arnold seduces two girls, the march is repeated. As Konstantin rewinds the film in the end to make its ending more upbeat, he is singing the first vocal part of the symphony's finale in an electronically distorted way, and the finale ends the film as the credits are rolling.

Multiple Personalities
In Menschenliebe, Konstantin is portrayed as Arnold's alter ego, which is hinted at many times in the film and is a theme addressed right in the beginning.

Arnold mentions that the day before Menschenliebes story starts, he attended a performance of Don Giovanni. In the opening of the film, while waiting for his metro, he observes a man kissing a woman: Konstantin. Starting immediately when Arnold arrives at University until Konstantin appears in person to talk to Arnold, editing foreshadows his appearance: Whenever Arnold faces a frustrating situation and remains calm on the outside, there are brief inserts of Konstantin reacting violently towards the surroundings. By editing it is suggested that Konstantin is Arnold's frustration personified. Alexander Tuschinski describes Konstantin as a "wild animal who doesn't adhere to social conventions and just takes what he wants - in a charming way".

One possible interpretation could be that Arnold observes a man kissing a woman on his way to University after watching Don Giovanni the day before, and afterwards mixes the kissing person and Don Giovanni in his mind to create the image of a person he'd like to be. It could also be that the kissing man in the beginning is already Konstantin, created in Arnold's fantasy from the beginning.

 Production 
Source:

 Overview 
The film is considered a Low-Budget-Film, as everybody involved participated without payment. The cast consists of 46 mostly first-time actors. Alexander Tuschinski produced the film parallel to and independent of studying at Hochschule der Medien, Stuttgart.

 Development 
Alexander Tuschinski started writing first drafts of the screenplay in October 2009, as he was starting his studies at Hochschule der Medien. In the screenplay, he used a lot of inspiration from his everyday life as a student. The first two scenes he wrote were the dialogue between Arnold and Konstantin in the bar, and Arnold's computer science class. As Tuschinski had previously produced Killer-Squirrels, an absurdist comedy, he originally intended to follow up with a dramatic, philosophical post-apocalyptic film. Working on parallel on both screenplays, he decided that he preferred the lighter comedic tone of Menschenliebe. He wrote down the final draft of the Menschenliebe-script in the first two weeks of December 2008. Most scenes were written while listening to classical music, often those pieces that ended up being played as background music in the respective scenes. The scene in the student-society was based on one that Tuschinski had written for a (yet unproduced) screenplay about a young composer in 2007, and was re-written by him to fit Menschenliebe. Until filming started in March 2009, Tuschinski did a lot of location-scouting on the weekends and during breaks at university. He quotes O Lucky Man! as one of his key inspirations when writing Menschenliebe, as both films feature a young, almost naive protagonist who is dragged into many different situations - though their storylines are very different.

 Casting 
The search for the lead actor portraying the protagonist Arnold Richter was described as a great challenge by Tuschinski: The film's scenes were often absurdist and surrealist, and the main character was supposed to counter this by being "normal" and likeable in even the most outrageous scenarios. From multiple candidates, he finally chose Sebastian B. who had collaborated on multiple short videos that Tuschinski directed before Menschenliebe. The other major roles were mostly first-time actors. Some smaller parts were cast right before their respective days of filming.

 Filming 
Filming started in late March 2009, and the last day of filming was September 1, 2009. The first scene filmed was Arnold's sad walk through the park, and the last one Konstantin's seduction of the punk-girl. As most actors and participants were students at the time of filming, most filming was done on the weekends to accommodate their schedule. While writing, Tuschinski had already planned that very few characters would be present in all scenes, in order to make casting smaller parts easier and more spontaneous. Menschenliebe marks the first collaboration with cinematographer Matthias Kirste, who went on to do cinematography in almost all of Tuschinski's films afterwards.

 Editing 
Most scenes were edited by Tuschinski right the very night after filming them. For him, this working style is important, as he keeps a list of shots and possible edits in his head during filming, and prefers editing when all the shots and different takes are still fresh in his memory. Therefore, the first rough cut of the whole film was ready by October 15, 2009. For the next months, music rights were cleared. Originally, there were two original songs in the film, one explaining Arnold's online-dating experiences in a funny way. For pacing-reasons, Tuschinski removed the song after editing the first rough cut and replaced it with an experimental stream-of-consciousness montage.

 Release 
The private premiere for cast and crew with a preliminary edit was held at Dillmann-Gymnasium in Stuttgart in January 2010, and the official public premiere took place in December 2010. By the time the official premiere of Menschenliebe took place, Tuschinski had already started filming his next project Break-Up. In 2011 and 2012, the film was screened and awarded at numerous international festivals. In June 2013, Menschenliebe was released online.

 Reception 

 Awards 
The film won the following awards:
 Best Comedy: Hollywood Reel Independent Film Festival 2011..
 Gold Medal for Excellence: Park City Film Music Festival 2010.
 Best Director (for Alexander Tuschinski): California Film Awards 2011.
 Best Foreign Film: Nevada International Film Festival 2011.
 Special Jury Award: Honolulu Film Awards 2012.
 Best New Director''' (nominated): Action On Film International Film Festival 2011.
Additionally, the film was official selection at the following festivals:
 Independent Filmmakers Showcase, Hollywood 2012
 Independent Days Karlsruhe 2011
 Berlin Independent Film Festival 2013
 Jugendfilmpreis Baden-Württemberg 2010

References

External links 
 
 
 
 
 Stuttgarter Zeitung: Article on the Production
 Stuttgarter Zeitung: Article on Alexander Tuschinski's works, including Menschenliebe
 Hochschule der Medien, Stuttgart: Article on "Menschenliebe"
 Inka-Magazin: Article on lineup for Independent Days, including "Menschenliebe"

Films directed by Alexander Tuschinski
German drama films
2010s German films